Gregory Edward Schiano (born June 1, 1966) is an American football coach. He is the head football coach at Rutgers University, a position he held from 2001 to 2011 and resumed before the 2020 season. Schiano served as the head coach for the Tampa Bay Buccaneers of the National Football League (NFL) from 2012 to 2013.

Early life and education
Schiano was born and grew up in Wyckoff, New Jersey, and attended Ramapo High School. He then attended Bucknell University, where he was a member of Phi Gamma Delta fraternity, and graduated in 1988 with a B.S. in business administration. Despite being a 190-pound linebacker in high school, Bucknell assistant Joe Susan felt he was a perfect fit for the defense. Susan would later join Schiano at Rutgers.

Playing career
Playing at linebacker, Schiano was a three-year letterman at Bucknell. In his junior year, he led the team with 114 tackles and was named to the All-Conference team. In his senior year, he was named team captain, and was named to the Sporting News Pre-season All-America Team.

Coaching career
Schiano began his coaching career in 1988 as an assistant coach at Ramapo High School for the Raiders football team. In 1989, he served as a graduate assistant at Rutgers. In 1990, he took the same position at Penn State, and later served as the defensive backfield coach there from 1991 until 1995.
From 1996 to 1998, Schiano was an assistant coach in the NFL with the Chicago Bears. For his first two seasons there, he was a defensive assistant, and then was promoted in his third and final season with the Bears to defensive backfield coach.

University of Miami

Schiano served as defensive coordinator for the University of Miami Hurricanes from 1999 to 2000. In 1999, Miami finished the year ranked 12th in the NCAA's Division I-A in points allowed per game (17.2), and in 2000 moved up to 5th (15.5 points allowed per game). His brief 18-month stint at Miami and his roots in New Jersey made him a candidate for his next position as head coach at Rutgers University.

While at the University of Miami, Schiano coached NFL Pro Bowlers Dan Morgan, Jonathan Vilma, and Ed Reed.

Rutgers
On December 1, 2000, Schiano accepted the head coaching position at Rutgers, the State University of New Jersey. He was given the task of turning around a struggling program that had been without a bowl game appearance since the 1978 Garden State Bowl, and had just four winning seasons since 1980. Although Schiano was producing solid recruiting classes, especially by Rutgers standards, the Scarlet Knights struggled to losing records in his first four seasons as head coach. It was believed coming into the 2005 season that Schiano was on the hot seat and would need to take Rutgers to a bowl game to keep his job.

2005
Despite the rough start to his tenure at Rutgers, Schiano began to turn around the program during the 2005 season. Schiano recruited New York native Ray Rice, who was considered the top running back in the tri-state area. He coached Rutgers to a 7–4 record that season. The highlight of their season came in a nationally televised 37–29 upset win over Pittsburgh and their coach Dave Wannstedt, a long-time friend of Schiano's, who hired him while coaching the Chicago Bears. At season's end, Schiano and the Scarlet Knights accepted a bid to play in the Insight Bowl against Arizona State, which Rutgers lost by a score of 45–40. Just prior to the game, Schiano was offered a new contract, extending his contract through the 2012 season. The 2005 season laid the foundation for a rebirth of the Rutgers football program.

2006
In the 2006 season, Schiano's Scarlet Knights raced off to a 9–0 record, highlighted by their November 9 victory over the third-ranked, undefeated Louisville Cardinals. After this game, Rutgers jumped to seventh in the national AP Poll, which was their highest ranking in school history and first Top 25 ranking since 1976. The euphoria from the win and high ranking quickly faded the following week with a loss to Cincinnati, but the Scarlet Knights bounced back to finish 11–2 and qualify for the inaugural Texas Bowl. There, they would defeat the Kansas State Wildcats 37–10, capturing their first-ever bowl game win in school history.

Throughout the season, coach Schiano and Rutgers were featured prominently in both the local and national media, and Schiano's motivational phrase "keep choppin'" became part of the lexicon of college football. Rutgers finished the season ranked 12th in the national poll, their best finish in school history. For his work in the 2006 season, Coach Schiano was awarded several Coach of the Year honors, including the Home Depot Coach of the Year award and the inaugural Liberty Mutual Coach of the Year Award.

With high expectations after their "Cinderella" season, Schiano coached Rutgers to respectable finishes and three more bowl game victories to give them four in a row. Schiano's team experienced tragedy in 2010, when defensive tackle Eric LeGrand suffered a spinal cord injury. This clearly affected the team's play: when the extent of LeGrand's injury became apparent, it contributed to sending Rutgers into a funk that resulted in a six-game losing streak to end the season.

Schiano has been credited for his involvement in LeGrand's recovery, essentially treating LeGrand's family like his own and assisting the family in any way needed, and being with LeGrand every day he was in the hospital. Though LeGrand was initially given a diagnosis of lifetime paralysis, he has since regained movement in his arms and shoulders and sensation throughout his body.

2011
In 2011, Rutgers rebounded from the previous season to post a 9–4 record and once again earn a bowl game berth. In the Pinstripe Bowl, they defeated Iowa State 27–13, which would be his final game as Rutgers coach. He led the team to winning seasons and bowl game berths in six of his final seven seasons, with wins in the final five bowl games.

NFL players who played under Schiano at Rutgers:
 San Francisco 49ers wide receiver Mohamed Sanu
 Cincinnati Bengals long snapper/tight end Clark Harris
 Retired Tennessee Titans cornerback Jason McCourty
 Retired Baltimore Ravens running back Ray Rice
 Retired Tennessee Titans wide receiver Kenny Britt
 Retired New England Patriots wide receiver Tiquan Underwood 
 New England Patriots free safety Devin McCourty
 Tampa Bay Buccaneers free safety Logan Ryan
 Retired New England Patriots linebacker Jonathan Freeny
 Atlanta Falcons safety Duron Harmon
 Retired Seattle Seahawks quarterback Mike Teel
 Retired Baltimore Ravens center Jeremy Zuttah
 Retired Pittsburgh Steelers center Darnell Stapleton
 Retired Cincinnati Bengals fullback Brian Leonard
 Retired San Francisco 49ers right Tackle Anthony Davis

Tampa Bay Buccaneers
On January 26, 2012, Schiano accepted his first head coaching opportunity at the professional level, with the NFL's Tampa Bay Buccaneers. The Buccaneers ended the 2012 regular season with a 7–9 record, missing the playoffs in the process. In the 2013 season, the team regressed to 4–12. On December 30, 2013, the Buccaneers fired Schiano along with Mark Dominik, the general manager who had selected him.

Ohio State
In 2016, after two seasons coaching Berkeley Preparatory School and sending two players to Davidson College in North Carolina, Schiano was hired by head coach Urban Meyer to serve as defensive coordinator/associate head coach for the Ohio State Buckeyes football program, replacing Chris Ash who, coincidentally, left Ohio State to accept the head coaching position at Rutgers.

Following two successful seasons with top ten defenses as Ohio State's defensive coordinator, Schiano became a target for several coaching jobs both in the NCAA and NFL. On November 26, 2017, it was reported that he was going to be the next head coach for the Tennessee Volunteers. Due to fan disapproval due to his connection with the Penn State sexual abuse case, the University backed out of the deal and he remained at Ohio State. Less than six weeks later, it was once again reported that Schiano would be leaving, but this time he would be going back to the NFL as the New England Patriots' defensive coordinator. On February 7, 2018, Schiano decided to turn down the Patriots job and stay with the Buckeyes.

In 2018, Schiano was named 247Sports Recruiter of the Year in the Big Ten after helping the Buckeyes land the nation's second-ranked recruiting class. He finished second nationally in 247Sports Recruiter of the Year rankings. Schiano served as the primary recruiter for five-star offensive tackle Nicholas Petit-Frere, the nation's second-ranked tight end Jeremy Ruckert and the nation's top-ranked center Matthew Jones. Schiano also served as the primary recruiter on center Luke Wypler, safety Josh Proctor, safety Ronnie Hickman, defensive tackle Tyler Friday and linebacker Javontae Jean-Baptiste. Schiano was also credited with helping land cornerback Jeffrey Okudah. In a story written by Okudah in The Players Tribune, Okudah said: Last June, Coach Schiano at Ohio State said something that really stuck with me. In fact, I think it ultimately played a big part in my decision to go there. He told me, "Jeff, you've had a tough life up to this point. It's time for some good things to happen to you."

While the Ohio State defense struggled in 2018 after losing defensive end Nick Bosa, Schiano took on a larger role, helping then interim head coach Ryan Day during head coach Urban Meyer's suspension. After the win against TCU, Day credited Schiano for his help leading the program during tough times. "What Greg Schiano has done for me in the last month is something I'll never forget. He is the classiest person I've ever been around in the coaching profession. The way he's handled himself, helping me along the way, counseling me on day-to-day stuff." Schiano also led the punt block unit and was credited for a unique scheme design that led to punt blocks for a safety against Nebraska and a touchdown against Michigan. Per Urban Meyer after the Nebraska game, "That was a tremendous momentum-changer. You wish you could have recovered it for a touchdown but we got a safety and got the ball back."

In Schiano's three seasons as defensive coordinator with the Buckeyes, eleven defensive players were drafted to the NFL, including five first round picks (Lattimore, Hooker, Conley) and two top five selections (Ward and Bosa). Former Browns interim head coach and defensive coordinator Greg Williams credited Schiano with cornerback Denzel Ward's early development. "He (Ward) came here and has already shown some people—I think (Ohio State associate head coach/defensive coordinator) Greg Schiano did a great job of teaching some of those things there. He has been an example from Day 1 on how to play the ball in the air in man to man, and it has kind of bled to the group. I think Denzel set that example pretty well back in the spring. He still does a pretty good job of playing the ball. He has a very natural way of doing that."

New England Patriots
In February 2019, it was announced that Schiano would not be returning to Ohio State. It was reported that he was hired to join the New England Patriots as their defensive coordinator, but prior to the Patriots confirming this report, Schiano unexpectedly resigned from the Patriots on March 28, citing a desire to spend more time on his "faith and family."

Return to Rutgers
On December 1, 2019, after several weeks of negotiations and a groundswell of fan and booster support, Schiano rejoined Rutgers as the head coach, signing an eight-year, $32 million contract.

Controversy
In 2016, a Philadelphia court released documents in relation to the Penn State child sex abuse scandal revealing testimony from Mike McQueary stating that Schiano was aware of the abuse by fellow assistant coach Jerry Sandusky. In his testimony, McQueary claimed that Tom Bradley told him that: "only that he had—I can't remember if it was one night or one morning—but that Greg had come into his office white as a ghost and said he just saw Jerry doing something to a boy in the shower. And that's it. That's all he ever told me." Schiano denied having knowledge of the abuse. Bradley also denied telling McQueary that story and the police denied other events that McQueary had asserted.

On November 26, 2017, the University of Tennessee was set to announce Schiano as the head football coach. However, due to a social media campaign including state representatives, alumni, national and local sportswriters, fans, and gubernatorial candidates, unhappy with Schiano's tenure at Penn State during the child sex abuse scandal, Tennessee backed out of the deal. Afterwards, officials from both Penn State and Ohio State defended Schiano, saying he had nothing to do with the scandal. Tennessee received criticism from some national sportswriters for a perceived overreactive handling as a response to social media.

Personal life

Schiano is married and has four children. Schiano's wife Christy was born Christina Mitchell, on October 29, 1968; she is one of four children born to Ella Alexander and the late Tom Mitchell. Schiano's father-in-law was a former Colts tight end who had played his college football at Bucknell. Mitchell died of cancer at 72 on July 16, 2017. Son Joe Schiano is a defensive lineman at Bucknell.

Awards and bowl bids

Schiano received most of the major 2006 national Coach of the Year awards after orchestrating what was considered by many to be one of the great turnaround stories in college football history, transforming the hapless Scarlet Knights into a winning football program (see above).

On December 4, 2006, one day after Rutgers accepted a bid to play in the 2006 Texas Bowl against Kansas State, Schiano announced that he would not be a candidate for the recently vacated head coaching job at his previous employer, the University of Miami, ending rumors and speculation that he would leave his creation at upstart Rutgers to return to Miami. He stated that he is "very happy at Rutgers" and that Rutgers is just beginning to "scratch the surface" of what the team can accomplish. He confirmed this by signing yet another contract extension, announced on February 16, 2007, upping his yearly compensation to $1.5 million per year and extending his deal with Rutgers to 2016. Schiano's 2011 salary and compensation of $2.3 million made him "by far" the highest-paid public employee in New Jersey, as well as the highest-paid coach in the Big East.

In December 2007, the Star-Ledger reported that Schiano spoke with University of Michigan athletic director Bill Martin "for quite a while" on December 5 about the head-coaching vacancy at the school. Two days later, he withdrew his name from consideration and remained Rutgers' head coach. In 2008, after a bad start, his Knights ended up 8–5 with their fourth straight bowl bid. Schiano's name once again came up in general speculation about the Miami head coaching position in 2010, after the firing of Randy Shannon.

The Schiano Proposal
In 2011, after Eric LeGrand was paralyzed during a kickoff, Schiano came up with an idea for eliminating kickoffs from football, replacing them with a punt, which is less likely to cause serious injury to the players. Under his proposal, the team would start from their own 30 (or 35) yard line and have the choice of either punting the ball or, in lieu of an onside kick, face the equivalent of a 4th down and 15. As of 2020, neither the NFL nor NCAA has seriously considered this proposal. Sportswriter Jon Bois has been an advocate for the proposal, saying "it's simple, obvious, less dangerous, and more fun".

Head coaching record

College

*Rutgers received a Gator Bowl invite due to Texas A&M’s COVID opt out, despite their losing record in 2021.

NFL

References

External links
 Rutgers profile

1966 births
Living people
American football linebackers
Bucknell Bison football players
Chicago Bears coaches
Miami Hurricanes football coaches
Ohio State Buckeyes football coaches
Penn State Nittany Lions football coaches
Rutgers Scarlet Knights football coaches
Tampa Bay Buccaneers head coaches
High school football coaches in New Jersey
Ramapo High School (New Jersey) alumni
People from Wyckoff, New Jersey
Sportspeople from Bergen County, New Jersey
Coaches of American football from New Jersey
Players of American football from New Jersey